David L. Brower (born May 26, 1932) is an American politician from the state of Florida.

Brower was born in Miami. He was president of Brower Press Incorporated, a real estate and investments firm. He served in the Florida House of Representatives from 1966 to 1968, as a Democrat, representing the 111th district.

References

Living people
1932 births
Democratic Party members of the Florida House of Representatives
Politicians from Miami